The Chief Justice of India is the head of the Supreme Court of India as well as the highest-ranking group 'A' gazetted officer  of the Indian Judiciary. The Constitution of India grants power to the president of India to appoint, in consultation with the outgoing chief justice, the next chief justice, who will serve until they reach the age of sixty-five or on completion of three years, whichever is earlier. Chief Justice of India can be impeached from service by the President of India on advice of the Parliament of India. As per convention, the name suggested by the incumbent chief justice is almost always the next senior most judge in the Supreme Court.

However this convention has been broken twice. In 1973, Justice A. N. Ray was appointed superseding three senior judges. Also, in 1977 Justice Mirza Hameedullah Beg was appointed as the chief justice superseding Justice Hans Raj Khanna.

As head of the Supreme Court, the chief justice is responsible for the allocation of cases and appointment of constitutional benches which deal with important matters of law. In accordance with Article 145 of the Constitution of India and the Supreme Court Rules of Procedure of 1966, the chief justice allocates all work to the other judges who are bound to refer the matter back to them (for re-allocation) in any case where they require it to be looked into by a larger bench of more judges.

On the administrative side, the chief justice carries out functions of maintenance of the roster, appointment of court officials and general and miscellaneous matters relating to the supervision and functioning of the Supreme Court.

The 50th and present chief justice is Dhananjaya Y. Chandrachud. He was sworn in as the 50th chief justice of India on 9 November 2022.

Appointment
As the incumbent chief justice approaches retirement, the Ministry of Law and Justice seeks a recommendation from the incumbent chief justice. Consultations with other judges might also take place. The recommendation is then presented to the prime minister, who passes the advice on to the president.

Removal 
Article 124(4) of Constitution of India lays down the procedure for removal of a judge of Supreme Court which is applicable to chief justices as well. Once appointed, the chief justice remains in the office until the age of 65 years. There is no fixed tenure provided in the constitution.  He can be removed only through a process of removal by Parliament as follows:

Acting president
The President (Discharge of Functions) Act, 1969 specifies that the Chief Justice of India shall act as the President of India in the event of the offices of both the president and the vice president being vacant. When President Zakir Hussain died in office, Vice President V. V. Giri, acted as the president. Later, Giri resigned as the vice president. The chief justice, Justice Mohammad Hidayatullah then became the acting president of India. As per the convention, the senior most judge of the Supreme Court became the acting chief justice. When the newly elected president took office a month later, Justice Hidayatullah reverted as the chief justice of India.

List of chief justices of India

Remuneration
The Constitution of India gives the power of deciding remuneration as well as other conditions of service of the chief justice to the Parliament of India. Accordingly, such provisions have been laid down in The Supreme Court Judges (Salaries and Conditions of Service) Act, 1958. This remuneration was revised in 2006–2008, after the sixth Central Pay Commission's recommendation. According to Seventh pay commission in 2016 the salary is revised

2018 crisis 
In 2018, in an unprecedented act, four supreme court justices spoke out against the then Chief Justice Dipak Misra. Though the chief justice's powers and duties have been considered equivalent to the other justices of the Supreme Court, under Misra, the court established the chief justice as the "Master of Roster" and pronounced that the chief justice "alone has the prerogative to constitute the benches of the court and allocate cases to the benches so constituted" even if the case involved accusations against the chief justice themselves, thus creating the provision to violate the in causa sua principle of natural justice.

References

External links
 
 Official website of Supreme Court of India

India, Chief Justice
Supreme Court of India
Indian judges
 
Lists of Indian people
Judiciary of India
India law-related lists